This is a list of foreign ministers in 2005.

Africa
 Algeria -
 Abdelaziz Belkhadem (2000-2005)
 Mohammed Bedjaoui (2005-2007)
 Angola - João Bernardo de Miranda (1999-2008)
 Benin - Rogatien Biaou (2003-2006)
 Botswana - Mompati Merafhe (1994-2008)
 Burkina Faso - Youssouf Ouédraogo (1999-2007)
 Burundi -
 Terence Sinunguruza (2001-2005)
 Antoinette Batumubwira (2005-2009)
 Cameroon - Laurent Esso (2004-2006)
 Cape Verde - Víctor Borges (2004-2008)
 Central African Republic -
 Charles Wénézoui (2003-2005)
 Jean-Paul Ngoupandé (2005-2006)
 Chad -
 Nagoum Yamassoum (2003-2005)
 Ahmad Allam-Mi (2005-2008)
Comoros -
 Mohamed El-Amine Souef (2002-2005)
 Aboudou Soefou (2005-2006)
 Republic of Congo - Rodolphe Adada (1997-2007)
 Democratic Republic of Congo - Raymond Ramazani Baya (2004-2007)
 Côte d'Ivoire - Bamba Mamadou (2003-2006)
 Djibouti -
 Ali Abdi Farah (1999-2005)
 Mahamoud Ali Youssouf (2005–present)
 Egypt - Ahmed Aboul Gheit (2004-2011)
 Equatorial Guinea - Pastor Micha Ondó Bile (2003-2012)
 Eritrea -
 Ali Said Abdella (2000-2005)
 Mohamed Omer (acting) (2005-2007)
 Ethiopia - Seyoum Mesfin (1991-2010)
 Gabon - Jean Ping (1999-2008)
 The Gambia -
 Sidi Moro Sanneh (2004-2005)
 Musa Gibril Bala Gaye (2005)
 Lamin Kaba Bajo (2005-2006)
 Ghana - Nana Akufo-Addo (2003-2007)
 Guinea -
 Mamady Condé (2004-2005)
 Fatoumata Kaba (2005-2006)
 Guinea-Bissau -
 Soares Sambu (2004-2005)
 António Isaac Monteiro (2005-2007)
 Kenya -
 Chirau Ali Mwakwere (2004-2005)
 Raphael Tuju (2005-2008)
 Lesotho - Monyane Moleleki (2004-2007)
 Liberia - Thomas Nimely (2003-2006)
 Libya - Abdel Rahman Shalgham (2000-2009)
 Madagascar - Marcel Ranjeva (2002-2009)
 Malawi -
 George Chaponda (2004-2005)
 Davis Katsonga (2005-2006)
 Mali -  Moctar Ouane (2004-2011)
 Mauritania -
 Mohamed Vall Ould Bellal (2003-2005)
 Ahmed Ould Sid'Ahmed (2005-2007)
 Mauritius -
 Jaya Krishna Cuttaree (2003-2005)
 Madan Dulloo (2005-2008)
 Morocco - Mohamed Benaissa (1999-2007)
 Western Sahara - Mohamed Salem Ould Salek (1998–2023)
 Mozambique -
Leonardo Simão (1994-2005)
Alcinda Abreu (2005-2008)
 Namibia - Marco Hausiku (2004-2010)
 Niger - Aïchatou Mindaoudou (2001-2010)
 Nigeria - Oluyemi Adeniji (2003-2006)
 Rwanda - Charles Murigande (2002-2008)
 São Tomé and Príncipe - Ovídio Manuel Barbosa Pequeno (2004-2006)
 Senegal - Cheikh Tidiane Gadio (2000-2009)
 Seychelles -
 Jérémie Bonnelame (1997-2005)
 Patrick Pillay (2005-2009)
 Sierra Leone - Momodu Koroma (2002-2007)
 Somalia - Abdullahi Sheikh Ismail (2004-2006)
 Somaliland - Edna Adan Ismail (2003-2006)
 South Africa - Nkosazana Dlamini-Zuma (1999-2009)
 Sudan -
 Mustafa Osman Ismail (1998-2005)
 Lam Akol (2005-2007)
 Swaziland - Mabili Dlamini (2003-2006)
 Tanzania - Jakaya Kikwete (1995-2006)
 Togo -
Kokou Tozoun (2003-2005)
Zarifou Ayéva (2005-2007)
 Tunisia -
Abdelbaki Hermassi (2004-2005)
Abdelwahab Abdallah (2005-2010)
 Uganda -
Tom Butime (2004-2005)
Sam Kutesa (2005–2021)
 Zambia -
Kalombo Mwansa (2002-2005)
Ronnie Shikapwasha (2005-2006)
 Zimbabwe -
 Stan Mudenge (1995-2005)
 Simbarashe Mumbengegwi (2005–2017)

Asia
 Afghanistan - Abdullah Abdullah (2001-2006)
 Armenia - Vartan Oskanian (1998-2008)
 Azerbaijan - Elmar Mammadyarov (2004–2020)
 Nagorno-Karabakh -
Arman Melikyan (2004-2005)
Georgy Petrosyan (2005-2011)
 Bahrain -
 Sheikh Muhammad ibn Mubarak ibn Hamad Al Khalifah (1971-2005)
 Sheikh Khalid ibn Ahmad Al Khalifah (2005–2020)
 Bangladesh - Morshed Khan (2001-2006)
 Bhutan - Khandu Wangchuk (2003-2007)
 Brunei - Pengiran Muda Mohamed Bolkiah (1984–2015)
 Cambodia - Hor Namhong (1998–2016)
 China - Li Zhaoxing (2003-2007)
 East Timor - José Ramos-Horta (2000-2006)
 Georgia -
Salome Zourabichvili (2004-2005)
Gela Bezhuashvili (2005-2008)
 Abkhazia - Sergei Shamba (2004-2010)
 South Ossetia - Murat Dzhioyev (1998-2012)
 India -
Natwar Singh (2004-2005)
Manmohan Singh (2005-2006)
 Indonesia - Hassan Wirajuda (2001-2009)
 Iran -
 Kamal Kharazi (1997-2005)
 Manouchehr Mottaki (2005-2010)
 Iraq - Hoshyar Zebari (2003–2014)
 Israel - Silvan Shalom (2003-2006)
 Palestinian Authority -
 Nabil Shaath (2003-2005)
 Nasser al-Qudwa (2005-2006)
 Japan -
 Nobutaka Machimura (2004-2005)
 Taro Aso (2005-2007)
 Jordan -
 Hani al-Mulki (2004-2005)
 Farouq Qasrawi (2005)
 Abdul Ilah Khatib (2005-2007)
 Kazakhstan - Kassym-Jomart Tokayev (2002-2007)
 North Korea - Paek Nam-sun (1998-2007)
 South Korea - Ban Ki-moon (2004-2006)
 Kuwait - Sheikh Mohammad Sabah Al-Salem Al-Sabah (2003-2011)
 Kyrgyzstan -
 Askar Aitmatov (2002-2005)
 Roza Otunbayeva (2005)
 Alikbek Jekshenkulov (2005-2007)
 Laos - Somsavat Lengsavad (1993-2006)
 Lebanon -
Mahmoud Hammoud (2004-2005)
Fawzi Salloukh (2005-2009)
 Malaysia - Syed Hamid Albar (1999-2008)
 Maldives -
Fathulla Jameel (1978-2005)
Ahmed Shaheed (2005-2007)
 Mongolia - Tsendiin Mönkh-Orgil (2004-2006)
 Myanmar - Nyan Win (2004-2011)
 Nepal -
Sher Bahadur Deuba (2004-2005)
Ramesh Nath Pandey (2005-2006)
 Oman - Yusuf bin Alawi bin Abdullah (1982–2020)
 Pakistan - Khurshid Mahmud Kasuri (2002-2007)
 Philippines - Alberto Romulo (2004-2011)
 Qatar - Sheikh Hamad bin Jassim bin Jaber Al Thani (1992-2013)
 Saudi Arabia - Prince Saud bin Faisal bin Abdulaziz Al Saud (1975–2015
 Singapore - George Yeo (2004-2011)
 Sri Lanka -
 Lakshman Kadirgamar (2004-2005)
 Anura Bandaranaike (2005)
 Mangala Samaraweera (2005-2007)
 Syria - Farouk al-Sharaa (1984-2006)
 Taiwan - Mark Chen (2004-2006)
 Tajikistan - Talbak Nazarov (1994-2006)
 Thailand -
 Surakiart Sathirathai (2001-2005)
 Kantathi Suphamongkhon (2005-2006)
 Turkey - Abdullah Gül (2003-2007)
 Turkmenistan - Raşit Meredow (2001–present)
 United Arab Emirates - Rashid Abdullah Al Nuaimi (1980-2006)
 Uzbekistan -
Sodiq Safoyev (2003-2005)
Elyor Ganiyev (2005-2006)
 Vietnam - Nguyễn Dy Niên (2000-2006)
 Yemen - Abu Bakr al-Qirbi (2001-2014)

Europe
 Albania -
 Kastriot Islami (2003-2005)
 Besnik Mustafaj (2005-2007)
 Andorra - Juli Minoves Triquell (2001-2007)
 Austria - Ursula Plassnik (2004-2008)
 Belarus - Sergei Martynov (2003-2012)
 Belgium - Karel De Gucht (2004-2009)
 Brussels-Capital Region - Guy Vanhengel (2000-2009)
 Flanders - Geert Bourgeois (2004-2008)
 Wallonia - Marie-Dominique Simonet (2004-2009)
 Bosnia and Herzegovina - Mladen Ivanić (2003-2007)
 Bulgaria -
Solomon Passy (2001-2005)
Ivailo Kalfin (2005-2009)
 Croatia -
 Miomir Žužul (2003-2005)
 Kolinda Grabar-Kitarović (2005-2008)
 Cyprus - Georgios Iacovou (2003-2006)
 Northern Cyprus - Serdar Denktaş (2004-2006)
 Czech Republic - Cyril Svoboda (2002-2006)
 Denmark - Per Stig Møller (2001-2010)
 Greenland - Josef Motzfeldt (2003-2007)
 Estonia -
 Kristiina Ojuland (2002-2005)
 Jaak Jõerüüt (acting) (2005)
 Rein Lang (2005)
 Urmas Paet (2005–2014)
 Finland - Erkki Tuomioja (2000-2007)
 France -
 Michel Barnier (2004-2005)
 Philippe Douste-Blazy (2005-2007)
 Germany -
Joschka Fischer (1998-2005)
Frank-Walter Steinmeier (2005-2009)
 Greece - Petros Molyviatis (2004-2006)
 Hungary - Ferenc Somogyi (2004-2006)
 Iceland -
 Davíð Oddsson (2004-2005)
 Geir Haarde (2005-2006)
 Ireland - Dermot Ahern (2004-2008)
 Italy - Gianfranco Fini (2004-2006)
 Latvia - Artis Pabriks (2004-2007)
 Liechtenstein -
 Ernst Walch (2001-2005)
 Rita Kieber-Beck (2005-2009)
 Lithuania - Antanas Valionis (2000-2006)
 Luxembourg - Jean Asselborn (2004–present)
 Macedonia - Ilinka Mitreva (2002-2006)
 Malta - Michael Frendo (2004-2008)
 Moldova - Andrei Stratan (2004-2009)
 Transnistria - Valeriy Litskai (2000-2008)
 Monaco - Rainier Imperti (2005-2006)
 Netherlands - Ben Bot (2003-2007)
 Norway -
Jan Petersen (2001-2005)
Jonas Gahr Støre (2005-2012)
 Poland -
Włodzimierz Cimoszewicz (2001-2005)
Adam Daniel Rotfeld (2005)
Stefan Meller (2005-2006)
 Portugal -
 António Monteiro (2004-2005)
 Diogo de Freitas do Amaral (2005-2006)
 Romania - Mihai-Răzvan Ungureanu (2004-2007)
 Russia - Sergey Lavrov (2004–present)
 San Marino - Fabio Berardi (2003-2006)
 Serbia and Montenegro - Vuk Drašković (2004-2007)
 Montenegro - Miodrag Vlahović (2004-2006)
 Slovakia - Eduard Kukan (1998-2006)
 Slovenia - Dimitrij Rupel (2004-2008)
 Spain - Miguel Ángel Moratinos (2004-2010)
 Sweden - Laila Freivalds (2003-2006)
 Switzerland - Micheline Calmy-Rey (2003-2011)

 Ukraine -
Kostyantyn Gryshchenko (2003-2005)
Borys Tarasyuk (2005-2007)
 United Kingdom - Jack Straw (2001-2006)
 Vatican City - Archbishop Giovanni Lajolo (2003-2006)

North America and the Caribbean
 Antigua and Barbuda -
Harold Lovell (2004-2005)
Baldwin Spencer (2005–2014)
 The Bahamas - Fred Mitchell (2002-2007)
 Barbados - Dame Billie Miller (1994-2008)
 Belize - Godfrey Smith (2003-2006)
 Canada - Pierre Pettigrew (2004-2006)
 Quebec - Monique Gagnon-Tremblay (2003-2008)
 Costa Rica - Roberto Tovar Faja (2002-2006)
 Cuba - Felipe Pérez Roque (1999-2009)
 Dominica -
 Osborne Riviere (2001-2005)
 Charles Savarin (2005-2007)
 Dominican Republic - Carlos Morales Troncoso (2004–2014)
 El Salvador - Francisco Laínez (2004-2008)
 Grenada - Elvin Nimrod (2000-2008)
 Guatemala - Jorge Briz Abularach (2004-2006)
 Haiti -
Yvon Siméon (2004-2005)
Hérard Abraham (2005-2006)
 Honduras -
Leonidas Rosa Bautista (2003-2005)
Mario Fortín (2005-2006)
 Jamaica - Keith Desmond Knight (2001-2006)
 Mexico - Luis Ernesto Derbez (2003-2006)
 Netherlands Antilles - Etienne Ys (2004-2006)
 Nicaragua - Norman José Caldera Cardenal (2002-2007)
 Panama - Samuel Lewis Navarro (2004-2009)
 Puerto Rico –
Jose Izquierdo Encarnacion (2003–2005)
Marisara Pont Marchese (2005)
Fernando Bonilla (2005–2009)
 Saint Kitts and Nevis - Timothy Harris (2001-2008)
 Saint Lucia - Petrus Compton (2004-2006)
 Saint Vincent and the Grenadines
 Louis Straker (2001-2005)
 Mike Browne (2005)
 Louis Straker (2005-2010)
 Trinidad and Tobago - Knowlson Gift (2001-2006)
 United States -
Colin Powell (2001-2005)
Condoleezza Rice (2005-2009)

Oceania
 Australia - Alexander Downer (1996-2007)
 Fiji - Kaliopate Tavola (2000-2006)
 French Polynesia -
 Gaston Flosse (2004-2005)
 Oscar Temaru (2005-2006)
 Kiribati - Anote Tong (2003–2016)
 Marshall Islands - Gerald Zackios (2001-2008)
 Micronesia - Sebastian Anefal (2003-2007)
 Nauru - David Adeang (2004-2007)
 New Zealand -
Phil Goff (1999-2005)
Winston Peters (2005-2008)
 Cook Islands -
 Tom Marsters (2004-2005)
 Wilkie Rasmussen (2005-2009)
 Niue - Young Vivian (2002-2008)
 Palau - Temmy Shmull (2001-2009)
 Papua New Guinea - Sir Rabbie Namaliu (2002-2006)
 Samoa - Tuilaepa Aiono Sailele Malielegaoi (1998–2021)
 Solomon Islands - Laurie Chan (2002-2006)
 Tonga - Sonatane Tu'a Taumoepeau Tupou (2004-2009)
 Tuvalu - Maatia Toafa (2004-2006)
 Vanuatu - Sato Kilman (2004-2007)

South America
 Argentina -
 Rafael Bielsa (2003-2005)
 Jorge Taiana (2005-2010)
 Bolivia -
 Juan Ignacio Siles (2003-2005)
 Armando Loaiza (2005-2006)
 Brazil - Celso Amorim (2003-2011)
 Chile - Ignacio Walker Prieto (2004-2006)
 Colombia - Carolina Barco (2002-2006)
 Ecuador -
 Patricio Zuquilanda (2003-2005)
 Antonio Parra Gil (2005)
 Francisco Carrión (2005-2007)
 Guyana - Rudy Insanally (2001-2008)
 Paraguay - Leila Rachid de Cowles (2003-2006)
 Peru -
Manuel Rodríguez Cuadros (2003-2005)
Fernando Olivera (2005)
Óscar Maúrtua de Romaña (2005-2006)
 Suriname -
 Marie Levens (2000-2005)
 Lygia Kraag-Keteldijk (2005-2010)
 Uruguay -
 Didier Opertti (1998-2005)
 Reinaldo Gargano (2005-2008)
 Venezuela - Alí Rodríguez Araque (2004-2006)

2005 in international relations
Foreign ministers
2005